An iron founder (also iron-founder or ironfounder) in its more general sense is a worker in molten ferrous metal, generally working within an iron foundry. However, the term 'iron founder' is usually reserved for the owner or manager of an iron foundry, a person also known in Victorian England as a 'master'. Workers in a foundry are generically described as 'foundrymen'; however, the various craftsmen working in foundries, such as moulders and pattern makers, are often referred to by their specific trades. 

Historically the appellation "founder" was given to the supervisor of a blast furnace, and persons who made castings in iron or other heavy metal. The term is also often applied to the company or works in which an iron foundry operates.

See also
 Foundry
 Casting (metalworking)
 Bellfounding
 Coremaking
 Foundry sand testing
 Smelting

References

Casting (manufacturing)
History of metallurgy
Metalworking occupations